Z is a 1999 Indian Kannada-language mystery thriller film written and directed by K. Praveen Nayak. It stars Prakash Rai, Prema and Ritu Shivpuri in the lead roles and features five different composers tuning for the soundtrack.

Z was released on 19 February 1999. It was dubbed in Telugu and released in Telugu as Maha Natudu.

Plot summary

Cast 
 Prakash Rai as Prakash 
 Prema as Prema
 Ritu Shivpuri
 Sundeep Malani
 Tennis Krishna
 Harsha Darbar
 Kote Prabhakar
 Agro Chikkanna
 Sunitha
 Nagesh Mayya
 Dinesh Mangalore
 K. Praveen Nayak 
 Vaijanath Biradar 
 Bank Suresh 
 Fayaz Khan 
 A. S. Murthy

Soundtrack 
Five composers contributed six tracks for the film, including the film's director Praveen Nayak, who composed one song and wrote lyrics for two others.

Reception 
A critic from The New Indian Express wrote that "The only reason to watch this movie is if you have nothing else to do".

References

External links 
 

1999 films
1990s Kannada-language films
Indian thriller films
Films scored by V. Manohar
Films about filmmaking
1999 directorial debut films
1999 thriller films
Films scored by Rajesh Ramnath